Florida is a Chilean town and commune located in the Concepción Province, Biobío Region.

Demographics
Of these, 3,875 (38.1%) lived in urban areas and 6,302 (61.9%) in rural areas. Between the 1992 and 2002 censuses, the population fell by 2.5% (260 persons).

Administration
As a commune, Florida is a third-level administrative division of Chile administered by a communal council, headed by an alcalde who is directly elected every four years. The 2008-2012 alcalde is Juan Vergara Reyes. The communal council has the following members:
 Aureliano Illanes (PRI)
 Jorge Roa (PDC)
 Juan Contreras (PS)
 Agustin Montero (RN)
 José Lizama (UDI)
 Renán Arriagada (Ind.)

Within the electoral divisions of Chile, Florida is represented in the Chamber of Deputies by Sergio Bobadilla (UDI) and Clemira Pacheco (PS) as part of the 45th electoral district, (together with Tomé, Penco, Hualqui, Coronel and Santa Juana). The commune is represented in the Senate by Alejandro Navarro Brain (MAS) and Hosain Sabag Castillo (PDC) as part of the 12th senatorial constituency (Biobío-Cordillera).

References

External links
 Municipality of Florida

Communes of Chile
Populated places in Concepción Province